Korab Syla (born 4 November 1992, in Kukës) is an Albanian-born American soccer player who played for the Syracuse Orange of the NCAA.

Club career
He moved to the United States from Albania when he was 14 with his family and went to Emerson Middle School in Yonkers, New York. In 2007, he started high school attending Saunders Trades and Technical High School. Missing out his first year playing soccer due to still settling into the country he played his sophomore year for the Blue Devils. All 3 years playing for his high school, he was considered highly rated around the league. In his senior year, he finished ranking 3rd in the league in scoring with 29 goals in 18 games. He was highly rated by many local colleges for his speed and exceptional dribbling ability for which he used score more goals than any other player between 75 other teams.

Honours
Herkimer Generals
NJCAA Division III (2): 2011, 2012

Individual
NJCAA Division III MVP (1): 2012
NJCAA Division III All-Region (1): 2012
NJCAA Division III JuCo All-America (1): 2012
NJCAA Division III All-East (1): 2012

References

1992 births
Living people
People from Kukës
Albanian footballers
American soccer players
Association football forwards
Association football midfielders
Syracuse Orange men's soccer players
Albanian expatriate footballers
Expatriate soccer players in the United States
Albanian expatriate sportspeople in the United States